Traces of Death is a 1993 Z movie mondo shockumentary that consists of various scenes of stock footage depicting death and real scenes of violence.

Unlike the earlier Faces of Death which included fake deaths and reenactments, Traces consists mostly of actual footage depicting death and injury, and consists also of public domain footage from other films. It was written and narrated by Damon Fox.

Since its release, Traces of Death has been followed by four sequels. The first sequel, Traces of Death II, was released in June 1994. This was followed by Traces of Death III in December 1994, Traces of Death IV: Resurrected in 1996 and Traces of Death V: Back in Action in April 2000.

Film content

In the first two films of the series, Damon Fox was the narrator. Darrin Ramage, who would later become the founder of Brain Damage Films, would become the host for the third, fourth and fifth volumes. Unlike Faces of Death, the footage throughout the entire films are real and are not staged or reenacted. Starting with Traces of Death II, scenes were accompanied by background music from death metal and grindcore bands.

Also contained in the series, especially in the first one, is footage of step-by-step autopsy procedures, which are shown from a coroner's point of view. Most of the other footage is recognizably notable. Among the footage samples seen on Traces of Death and in the sequels that followed are listed below.

Traces of Death (1993) 
 The 1993 murder of Maritza Martin Munoz
 The 1988 police chase of armed bank robber Phillip Hutchinson
 The 1980 Iranian Embassy siege
 The 1989 suicide attempt of Terry Rossland
 The 1984 race car crash of Ricky Rudd
 The 1990 race car crash of Allan McNish
 The 1990 racing incident of Willy T. Ribbs
 The 1992 racing crash of Kerry Madsen
 The 1986 Rally de Portugal crash
 The 1992 crash of the monster truck Bad Medicine
 The 1966 motorcycle stunt crash of Evel Knievel
 The 1967 Caesar Palace jump stunt crash of Evel Knievel
 The 1990 Dinamo–Red Star riot
 The 1986 Calgary Stampede chuckwagon accident
 The 1989 horse riding accident of Bill Peck
 The 1990 parachute skydiving accident of Mike Mcgee and Greg Jones
 The 1992 Maracanã Stadium collapse
 Anatoly Kvochur's plane at the 1989 Paris Air Show crashing after a birdstrike
 The 1987 press conference suicide of R. Budd Dwyer

The first film of the series also contains allegedly staged footage from Savage Man Savage Beast, where a tourist, Pit Dernitz supposedly gets mauled and eaten by African lions.

Other scenes that feature animals include undated footage of a pig experiment by military scientists at the Burn Center in Fort Sam Houston (derived from a 1987 mondo film entitled True Gore), an animal control officer, Florence Crowell being attacked by a pit bull in Los Angeles, California in 1987, and a black bear getting shocked off a utility pole in Albuquerque, New Mexico in 1989.

The first two films both contain scenes of sex reassignment surgery, which is featured in the 1974 mondo film Shocking Asia. Some autopsy footages were taken from the 1961 U.S. Army training film Basic Autopsy Procedure.

Also included is an interview with James Vance, who had attempted suicide with a shotgun at a church playground in Sparks, Nevada (taken from the documentary Dream Deceivers).

The only known footage showing evidence of Ilse Koch is included as well.

Traces of Death II (1994) 
 Iranian soldiers slaughtered by the Iraqi Regime during the Iran–Iraq War
 The 1981 assassination of Anwar Sadat
 Boston bomb expert Randolph G. LaMattina blasted in the face by a pipe bomb following its removal in 1985
 A robber blowing himself up after holding up a bank and being cornered by police at gunpoint in León, Spain in 1983
 A 1984 fire in a Rio de Janeiro apartment building, which led to four women falling to their deaths 
 The 1974 Joelma fire
 The 1979 Egyptian Embassy Siege in Ankara, Turkey
 The 1983 public execution of double murderer Ibrahim Tarraf
 Animal attacks such as a rodeo horse stomping its rider's face and goring from running of the bulls
 The 1963 self-immolation of Vietnamese monk Thích Quảng Đức
 Nelson Piquet fighting with Eliseo Salazar after a collision during the 1982 German Grand Prix
 A brawl at a press conference in Salt Lake City, Utah
 The 1985 Sanrizuka Struggle riots 
 The 1980 Scottish Cup Final riot
 Football hooliganism in Germany in 1988
 The 1985 Heysel Stadium disaster
 A courtroom outburst in Mobile, Alabama, in 1992
 Riots in Seoul, South Korea in 1987
 The death of Karl Wallenda
 The 1984 shooting of Jeff Doucet by Gary Plauché
 The 1986 Peruvian prison massacres
 The 1987 assault on Prime Minister Rajiv Gandhi
 The execution of Ishola Oyenusi
 A 1984 hot air balloon accident
 The murder of Mark Kilroy
 A deadly airshow crash in San Diego in 1978
 A Blue Angels air show crash in 1985
 The Controlled Impact Demonstration
 The 1988 crash of Air France Flight 296
 The 1981 Belgian Grand Prix racing crash
 The 1966 Indy 500 crash
 The death of Eddie Sachs
 The death of Riccardo Paletti

There is one unusual piece of footage taken at a monster truck show in Baltimore, Maryland, on March 23, 1992. What makes this footage so unusual is that the robot transformer at the show malfunctioned. A large rod from the malfunctioning robot went into the actor of the alien suit's chest, and exploded.

Another notable air show crash in the film took place in Plainview, Texas, on September 11, 1983, where the pilot lost both his plane's wings in mid-air and plummeted into the field below. There are many other various plane crashes and race car crashes during the middle and towards the end of the film.

Traces of Death III (1995) 
 The first Markale Massacre in 1994
 The 1994 Hadera bus station suicide bombing
 Killings of children during the Algerian Civil War
 Necklacing in South Africa
 Villager killings during the 1984 elections in El Salvador
 El Cordobés during his career in the bullring
 The Sabra and Shatila Massacre
 The 1991 discovery of Ötzi
 A 1988 crash involving the monster truck Wild Stang, which was one of the first monster truck crashes to be captured on film
 The 1985 race car crash of Bosco Lowe
 Rare scenes of body parts from victims of the Cambodian genocide and Burundian Genocide in 1972
 The assassination of a Haitian lawyer in 1994
 The 1994 assassination of Luis Donaldo Colosio
 Discoveries of skeletal remains in the Killing Fields in Cambodia

The third edition starts with crime scenes in urban American cities such as New York City, ranging from murders to traffic crashes. These pieces look as if taken from the '60s and '70s.

This volume also shows what it is like to survive an attack, as in a 1991 press conference of Frank Tempest, an English man disfigured in the face when he was attacked by two pit bulls.

Also included is graphic content of gang violence in Russia, various motocross and amateur race car crashes, and cockfighting held in the Philippines.

Traces of Death IV (1996) 
 The 1972 assassination attempt of George Wallace
 The stunt accident of Alexandre Kareem
 The 1992 Agdam Massacre, which was a massacre of Azerbaijanian civilians by Armenian militants during the First Nagorno-Karabakh War.
 Executions of Kurdish civilians during the Anfal Genocide
 A terrorist attack on a yacht perpetrated by the PLO in Cyprus in 1985.
 The Amiriyah shelter bombing
 The 1968 execution Of Nguyễn Văn Lém
 Riots in Seoul, South Korea in 1994 and 1987.
 Riots in Moscow, Russia, in 1993
 Bosnian soldiers caught in sniper crossfire during the Bosnian War
 The 1984 Kent and Dollar Farm massacres
 A 1986 stabbing attack in East Jerusalem, where a Palestinian terrorist is shot in the head by Israeli soldiers after they witnessed him stab a Jewish resident to death in the town square.
 A mortar attack in Bosnia that killed six people waiting for water in 1993.
 A mortar attack in Belgrade, Yugoslavia (now Serbia) that killed 16 civilians in line for water and bread on May 27, 1992.
 Villager killings during the 1984 elections in El Salvador

Another piece of notable footage in the fourth volume is a moose killing a man in Anchorage, Alaska on January 9, 1995.

Towards the start of the film graphic photographs of birth defects are shown.

There is also footage of traffic crashes from the graphic driving education film, Signal 30.

Traces of Death V (2000) 
 The 1980 murders of U.S. missionaries in El Salvador
 The 1998 Cúa hostage crisis
 The 1992 attack on Reginald Denny
 The 1990 Poll Tax Riots
 The 1990 Temple Mount riots in Al Aqsa, Jerusalem, Israel
 South Korean student clashing with riot police
 The 1998 suicide of Daniel V. Jones
backyard wrestling

The last volume starts with three police chases. The first was in Los Angeles in June 1996. The second was also in Los Angeles, but it took place in June 1995. The third took place in Whittier, California in September 1995. All were televised live by helicopter pilot Zoey Tur.

Soundtrack 
The music clearance were provided by Subtempeco Muzik (pseudonymously credited as T.O.D.), which derived from various film soundtracks. Later in Traces of Death 3, the first soundtrack album was released on CD.The soundtrack for the first installment were tracks by J.R. Bookwalter from the 1989 film Robot Ninja.

Traces Of Death III Soundtrack 
The soundtrack for Traces Of Death III was released on CD by Relapse Records in 1995. The music featured in the film include:

 Regina Confessorum by Dead World
 Orgy Of Self-Mutilation by Dead World
 Brainpan Blues by Pungent Stench
 Revenge by Core (band)
 Traces Of Death by Mortician (band)
 Frozen In Time by Kataklysm
 Slaughtered by Hypocrisy (band)
 Stained by Purge
 Sadistic Intent by Sinister (band)
 Violent Generation by Brutality (band)
 Skin Her Alive by Dismember (band)
 Into The Bizarre by Deceased (band)
 Low by Gorefest
 Vanished by Meshuggah
 Open Season by Exit-13
 Nightstalker by Macabre (band)
 Blood Everywhere by Dead World
 Down On Whores by Benediction (band)
 God Is A Lie by Hypocrisy (band)
 Bodily Dismemberment by Repulsion (band)
 Darkened Soul by Core (band)
 I Lead You Towards Glorious Times by Merzbow

Home media
In 2003, a box set of the entire series was released on DVD by Brain Damage Films.

Controversy
The original Traces of Death has run into controversy worldwide due to its graphic content. In 1997, Amy Hochberg, a woman living in Coaldale, Pennsylvania rented the film from a video store and was so disgusted by the film's content that she considered keeping the tape as to avoid children from procuring it from the store. She also contacted multiple animal rights groups after witnessing a scene in the film wherein a pig is experimented on with a blowtorch. She also lodged a complaint with the video store she had rented it from, as she thought the film was simply "911 calls with a little more".

In 2003, a DVD boxset of the film and its sequels were confiscated by the Australian Customs and Border Protection Service, after being deemed to "contravene Regulation 4A(1A)(a) of the Customs (Prohibited Imports) Regulations."

In 2005, the British Board of Film Classification refused to give the first film an age certificate, effectively banning it. The BBFC considered the film to have "no journalistic, educational or other justifying context for the images shown", while also suggesting that the film could potentially breach UK law under the Obscene Publications Act.

See also 
 Banned from Television

References

External links 

Official Traces of Death page at BrainDamageFilms.com

Mondo films
Obscenity controversies in film
American documentary films
American exploitation films
American splatter films